James Hector Northey "Hamish" Gray, Baron Gray of Contin,  (28 June 1927 – 14 March 2006) was a Scottish Conservative politician and life peer.

Gray was born in Inverness and educated at the Inverness Royal Academy. His father owned an Inverness roofing firm. He was commissioned into the Queen's Own Cameron Highlanders in 1945 and served in India, during partition. He married Judith Waite Brydon in 1953 and they had two sons and a daughter.

He was elected as an Independent member of Inverness Council in 1965 and at the 1970 general election he was elected to Parliament as the Conservative and Unionist Party Member of Parliament (MP) for Ross and Cromarty. He was appointed to the Whips' Office in 1971, and he served as a front bench Energy spokesman (1975–1979). Upon the Conservatives' return to government in 1979, he was appointed as the Minister of State for Energy under David Howell, where he remained until the 1983 general election, when he was defeated in the new Ross, Cromarty and Skye constituency by the SDP candidate Charles Kennedy.

He was made a life peer in 1983, taking the title Baron Gray of Contin, of Contin, in the District of Ross and Cromarty, and was Minister of State for Scotland from 1983 to 1986.

He served Inverness as Deputy lieutenant (1989), Vice Lord Lieutenant (1994) and Lord Lieutenant (1996–2002).

He died on 14 March 2006 at a hospice in Inverness after a long battle with cancer.

References 

1927 births
2006 deaths
Deaths from cancer in Scotland
Scottish Conservative Party MPs
Gray of Contin
Scottish Conservative Party councillors
Lord-Lieutenants of Inverness-shire
Members of the Privy Council of the United Kingdom
Members of the Parliament of the United Kingdom for Scottish constituencies
People educated at Inverness Royal Academy
People from Inverness
Queen's Own Cameron Highlanders officers
UK MPs 1970–1974
UK MPs 1974
UK MPs 1974–1979
UK MPs 1979–1983
Members of the Parliament of the United Kingdom for Highland constituencies
Life peers created by Elizabeth II